Knock-on may refer to:

 Rugby terminology:
 Knock-on (rugby league), error by the player in possession of the ball in rugby league football
 Knock-on (rugby union), event where the ball is knocked forward in rugby union

 Causality-related terms:
Knock-on electron 
 Knock-on effect

See also
 Fumble